Joanne Dawn Coburn (born 12 November 1967) is a British journalist with BBC News, a regular presenter of Politics Live (and formerly also Sunday Politics along with Andrew Neil) and previously had special responsibility for BBC Breakfast. She is a former BBC political correspondent for London, who covered the 2000 London Mayoral election.

Coburn is an occasional relief presenter on the BBC News Channel. She has presented on BBC Radio 4 in the past and also has guested on the weekend current affairs programme The World This Weekend as well as reviewing the Sunday newspapers on The Andrew Marr Show.

Early life and education
Coburn was educated at the North London Collegiate School, an independent school for girls in northwest London, followed by the University of Manchester, where she studied History and German, and the University of Oxford, where she studied Middle Eastern politics.

Career
Coburn worked for local radio stations in Berkshire, Buckinghamshire and Oxfordshire, including Mix 96 Aylesbury, Fox FM Oxford, and Star FM in Slough.

After working as a regional correspondent for BBC London for four years, Coburn joined BBC Breakfast in 2001 as a political correspondent. She had first come to prominence when she covered events surrounding the 2000 London Mayoral election, and she went on to cover the 2001 general election. During her time at BBC Breakfast she covered events surrounding the War in Afghanistan and the Iraq War, and returned from maternity leave in 2005 to report on that year's general election.

She spent some time presenting on the BBC News Channel, and three months as presenter of BBC Radio 4's political events programme The World This Weekend. She also covered the 2007 French presidential election and the Treaty of Lisbon ratification process. In 2008, she was part of the press pack during British prime minister Gordon Brown's visits to both Afghanistan and to Beijing for the closing days of the 2008 Summer Olympic Games.

Aside from presenting Daily Politics, Coburn is often used by the BBC for more general debates and interviews. In the 2015 general election, Coburn presented a live audience Question Time-style debate with the then UKIP leader, Nigel Farage, in Birmingham. On 9 January 2017, Coburn presented a live audience debate with a distinguished panel in East Grinstead about the continued Southern Rail strikes, entitled Southern Rail Crisis. In the 2017 general election, Coburn presented a similar live audience debate with the Green Party co-leader, Jonathan Bartley, and the then UKIP leader, Paul Nuttall, from The Bottle Yard Studios, Bristol.

Daily Politics and Politics Live
Coburn joined BBC Two's weekday political programme Daily Politics in 2008, presenting the show alongside Andrew Neil on Thursdays. From January 2010, she took over Anita Anand's role, presenting four days a week while Anand was away on maternity leave. Anand returned to the show in September 2010, meaning Coburn returned to presenting on the programme one day a week, this time on Fridays.

On 5 May 2010, Coburn joined Neil to present the final Daily Politics election debate, The Trust in Politics Debate, before the 2010 general election. The debate featured contributions from Harriet Harman, Sir George Young, Lynne Featherstone and Adam Price.

In July 2011, Anand left the programme to present a new show on 5 Live resulting in Jo Coburn becoming a full-time co-presenter from September with Andrew Neil. Coburn presented the Daily Politics on Mondays, Tuesdays and Fridays and was joined by Andrew Neil on Wednesdays for coverage of Prime Minister's Questions. In the programme, Neil often referred to her by the nickname "JoCo".

In 2018, Daily Politics was renamed Politics Live with a refreshed format and a single lead presenter. From 2019 Andrew Neil presents Politics Live only on Thursday, with Jo Coburn presenting on the other weekdays.

Coburn also presented a companion show, Politics Europe, and the regional opt-out, Sunday Politics London. Both Politics Europe and the Daily Politics were axed in 2018, with the latter replaced by Politics Live, which Coburn now presents, alongside the continuing Sunday Politics London.

Personal life
Coburn is Jewish and is an active member of Ealing Liberal Synagogue. She is married to former Downing Street head of strategic communications Mark Flanagan, has two children and lives in London.

References

External links 
 Jo Coburn at bbc.co.uk
 
 Q&A Jo Coburn interview at TV Newsroom

1967 births
Living people
Alumni of the University of Manchester
BBC newsreaders and journalists
English Jews
English political commentators
People from Hendon
People educated at North London Collegiate School
Alumni of the University of Oxford